Giovannantonio is a masculine blended given name that is a combination of Gianni and Antonio. Notable people known by this name include the following:

Giovannantonio Cipriani (1824 – 1906), Italian political activist 
Giovanantonio Tagliente, alternate name for Giovanni Antonio Tagliente (c. 1460s - c. 1528), Italian calligrapher, author, printer and publisher

See also

Giovan Antonio
Giovanni Antonio